Julia Rowena Tolmie is a New Zealand legal academic, and as of 2018 is a full professor at the University of Auckland.

Academic career

After an undergraduate at the University of Auckland and an LL.M. at Harvard University, Tolmie returned to the University of Auckland, rising to full professor. Registered with the bar in New Zealand and New South Wales, Australia, Tolmie has served on a number of domestic violence-related bodies.

Selected works 
 Sheehy, Elizabeth A., Julie Stubbs, and Julia Tolmie. "Defending battered women on trial: The battered woman syndrome and its limitations." (1992).
 Tolmie, Julia. "Corporate social responsibility." UNSWLJ 15 (1992): 268.
 Kaye, Miranda, and Julia Tolmie. "Fathers' rights groups in Australia and their engagement with issues in family law." Australian Journal of Family Law 12, no. 1 (1998): 19–67.
 Kaye, Miranda, and Julia Tolmie. "Discoursing dads: The rhetorical devices of fathers' rights groups." Melb. UL Rev. 22 (1998): 162.

References

External links
 

Living people
New Zealand women academics
Year of birth missing (living people)
Harvard Law School alumni
Academic staff of the University of Auckland
University of Auckland alumni
21st-century New Zealand lawyers
21st-century Australian lawyers